Skulk can refer to: 

Skulk,  a fictional character and Amalgam Comics superhero
 Skulk, a life form in the Natural Selection (computer game)
 Skulk (Dungeons & Dragons), a race from the Dungeons and Dragons role-playing game
 Skulk, a term for a group of foxes
 Skulk, an album by English singer-songwriter Jim Moray
 One of the three major types of enemies that can be encountered in Kiloo and Cophenhagen Creator's mobile RPG Dawnbringer